Sword for Hire is a 1979 role-playing game adventure for Tunnels & Trolls published by Flying Buffalo.

Plot summary
Sword for Hire is an adventure in which the player character is a low-level fighter or rogue who hires out as a mercenary to a local wizard to explore the sub-levels of his dungeon.

Reception
Lorin Rivers reviewed Sword for Hire in The Space Gamer No. 28. Rivers commented that "In the balance, this dungeon is certainly worth [the price]. I recommend it."

References

Role-playing game supplements introduced in 1979
Tunnels & Trolls adventures